The Hong Kong League Cup 2007–08 is the 8th staging of the Hong Kong League Cup.

The competition started on 19 January 2008 with 10 Hong Kong First Division clubs and concluded on 22 March 2008 with South China beat Kitchee by 4-2 in the final. South China won their second League Cup title.

Teams
Rangers
Citizen
Convoy Sun Hei
Eastern
Happy Valley
Kitchee
Lanwa Redbull
South China
Wofoo Tai Po
Workable

Details
 The 10 teams in Hong Kong First Division League is divided into groups A and B. Each team plays one match with other teams in the group once. The top 2 teams of the groups qualify for semi-finals.
 The teams are allocated in the groups according to their league positions after half season. Group A consists of South China (1st), Wofoo Tai Po (4th), Kitchee (5th), Happy Valley (8th) and Workable (10th). Group B consists of Citizen (2nd), Lanwa Redbull (3rd), Convoy Sun Hei (6th), Eastern (7th) and Bulova Rangers (9th).

Group stage

Group A

Group B

Knockout stage
All times are Hong Kong Time (UTC+8).

Bracket

Semi-finals

Final

Scorers
 5 goals
  Giovane (Convoy Sun Hei)

 4 goals
  Detinho (South China)
  Maxwell (South China)

 3 goals
  Rodrigo (Eastern)
  Tales Schutz (South China)

 2 goals
  Caleb Ekwenugo (Bulova Rangers)
  Chan Ho Man (Bulova Rangers)
  Wang Xuanhong (Citizen)
  Poon Yiu Cheuk (Happy Valley)
  Chan Siu Ki (Kitchee)
  Goran Stankovski (Kitchee)
  Wilfed Bamnjo (Kitchee)

 1 goal
  Edson Minga (Bulova Rangers)
  Liang Zicheng (Bulova Rangers)
  Batoum Roger (Convoy Sun Hei)
  Chan Yiu Lun (Convoy Sun Hei)
  Wong Yiu Fu (Eastern)
  Denisson (Happy Valley)
  Godfred Karikari (Happy Valley)
  Law Chun Bong (Happy Valley)
  Sham Kwok Keung (Happy Valley)
  Cheung Kin Fung (Kitchee) 
  Ewane Ngassa (Kitchee)
  Hugues Nanmi (Kitchee)
  Ivan Jević (Kitchee)
  Julius Akosah (Kitchee)
  Liu Quankun (Kitchee)
  Lo Kwan Yee (Kitchee)
  Aldo Villalba (Lanwa Redbull)
  David Godwin (Lanwa Redbull)
  Fan Weijun (South China)
  Itaparica (South China)
  Li Haiqiang (South China)
  Rafael (Wofoo Tai Po) 
  Ye Jia (Wofoo Tai Po)
  Wong Chun Yue (Workable)
  Roberto Fronza (Workable)

Individual prizes
 Top Scorer Award:  Giovane (Convoy Sun Hei) 
 Best Player Award:  Rodrigo (Eastern)

References

See also
Hong Kong League Cup
The Hong Kong Football Association
Hong Kong FA Cup 2007-08
Hong Kong First Division League 2007-08
Hong Kong Senior Shield 2007-08

Lea
Hong Kong League Cup
2008 domestic association football cups